Zouheir Al-Balah (born 1 July 1967) is a Syrian wrestler. He competed in the men's Greco-Roman 74 kg at the 1988 Summer Olympics.

References

External links
 

1967 births
Living people
Syrian male sport wrestlers
Olympic wrestlers of Syria
Wrestlers at the 1988 Summer Olympics
Place of birth missing (living people)
Wrestlers at the 1990 Asian Games
Asian Games competitors for Syria
20th-century Syrian people